The Brazil–Peru Railway or  Bi-Oceanic Railway is a proposed transcontinental railroad project that will link the Atlantic and Pacific Oceans via Bolivia. In 2017 it was estimated to cost € 12 billion.

The project was brought up in 2013 by heads of state Evo Morales and Xi Jinping as an alternative to maritime shipping between China and South America’s Atlantic coast.

On 6 December 2017 the head of state of Brazil and Bolivia signed an agreement for the upcoming track. There are two options for a track in a discussion: From Santos (Brazil) to Ilo (Peru) or from Santos (Brazil) to Matarani (Peru).

See also
Transcontinental railway Brasil-Peru
Central Bi-Oceanic railway

References 

Rail transport in Bolivia
Rail transport in Brazil
Rail transport in Peru
Rail transport in South America
International railway lines
Mountain railways